Rzhanaya Polyana is a natural area in Krasnodar Krai, Russia, located not far from Krasnaya Polyana.

Home of the Sliding Center Sanki, it hosted bobsleigh, luge, and skeleton events for the 2014 Winter Olympics held in Sochi.

References
 Bobsleigh and luge track for Sochi will be built in Rzhanaya Polyana. at the Fédération Internationale de Luge de Course (20 May 2009 article accessed 23 September 2009.)

Venues of the 2014 Winter Olympics
Sochi
Ski areas and resorts in Russia
Adlersky City District
Geography of Russia